Apostle of the North may refer to:

 Ansgar (801–865), archbishop of Hamburg-Bremen 
 Bernard Gilpin (1517–1583), English cleric
 Hyacinth of Poland (c.1185–1257), Polish priest
 John Macdonald (Apostle of the North) (1779–1849), minister of the Church of Scotland
The Apostle of the North, a biography of Macdonald by John Kennedy of Dingwall

See also
 Johannes Bugenhagen (1485–1558), German Lutheran reformer known as the "Second Apostle of the North"
 Rimbert (830–888), archbishop of Hamburg-Bremen known as the "Second Apostle of the North"
 Unni (bishop), archbishop of Hamburg-Bremen (916–936) and missionary in Sweden known as the "Third Apostle of the North"

Lists of people by epithet